The Yellowknife Education District No. 1 is the public school board in Yellowknife, Northwest Territories. The district, then called Yellowknife School District No. 1, was created 1 October 1939 by Charles Camsell who was Commissioner of the Northwest Territories.

History
The first meeting of the district was held 24 August 1939 when three people were elected making it the first democratically elected government body in the territory. Prior to the creation of the board a provisional school board had been established in 1938.

The first school in Yellowknife was the Log School House and Mildred Hall, of Fort Fitzgerald, was the first teacher. However, freeze up of the Slave River prevented her from arriving in Yellowknife until February 1939. Prior to her arrival classes were taught by D. A. Davies but he was not an accredited teacher. Mildred Hall was reappointed as teacher for 1939/40 and was paid $100 a month. This was her last year as a teacher in Yellowknife but she was later to sit on the school board. The school she originally taught in was designated a Yellowknife Heritage Site in 1988 and the building was moved from the Old Town to its current location next to Mildred Hall School and the board offices.

Yellowknife schools

List of schools

See also
 List of schools in the Northwest Territories
 Education in Canada

Mapping

 YK No. 1, 
 Old Log Cabin School, 
 J.H. Sissons School, 
 Mildred Hall School, 
 N.J. Macpherson School, 
 Range Lake North School, 
 Sir John Franklin High School, 
 William McDonald Middle School, 
 Kaw Tay Whee School, 
 K'àlemì Dene School,

References

External links

Yellowknife Education District No. 1 website
1939 Mildred Hall, 1st School Teacher in Yellowknife NWT Timeline, Prince of Wales Northern Heritage Centre
Yellowknife Education District No. 1 fonds. Northwest Territories Archives

School districts in the Northwest Territories
Education in Yellowknife